Acanthiophilus brunneus is a species of tephritid or fruit flies in the genus Acanthiophilus of the family Tephritidae.

Distribution
Ethiopia, Congo, Uganda, Kenya.

References

Tephritinae
Insects described in 1934
Diptera of Africa